Kilimanjaro Christian Medical University College (KCMUCo) is a constituent college of Tumaini University Makumira in Moshi, Tanzania.

References

External links
 

Colleges in Tanzania
Buildings and structures in the Kilimanjaro Region
Moshi, Tanzania
Educational institutions established in 1997
1997 establishments in Tanzania